Ussara is a genus of sedge moths. It was described by Francis Walker in 1864.

Species
 Ussara ancobathra
 Ussara ancyristis
 Ussara arquata
 Ussara chalcodesma
 Ussara chrysangela
 Ussara decoratella
 Ussara eurythmiella
 Ussara hilarodes
 Ussara iochrysa
 Ussara olyranta
 Ussara phaeobathra
 Ussara polyastra
 Ussara repletana
 Ussara semmicornis

References

Glyphipterigidae